Diane Archie, formerly Diane Thom, is a Canadian politician in the Northwest Territories. She is a member of the Legislative Assembly of the Northwest Territories and the current Deputy Premier of the Northwest Territories.

Career 
Archie was first elected in the 2019 election. She represents the electoral district of Inuvik Boot Lake, and she was elected to territorial cabinet by her member colleagues on October 24, 2019. She was appointed Deputy Premier, as well as Minister of Health and Social Services, Minister Responsible for the Status of Women, and Minister Responsible for People with Disabilities.

References 

Living people
Members of the Legislative Assembly of the Northwest Territories
Women MLAs in the Northwest Territories
People from Inuvik
21st-century Canadian politicians
21st-century Canadian women politicians
Year of birth missing (living people)
First Nations women in politics